William S. Hanna (May 9, 1923 - November 28, 1994) was a member of the Maryland House of Delegates.

Hanna was raised at the Temora Mansion in Ellicott City. In 1936, he built a homemade trailer with his friend, future senator James A. Clark, Jr. While traveling with Clark to the West Coast he was run over by a car in San Diego with only a sprained ankle as an injury. He graduated Ellicott City High School in 1943. Hanna served in the U.S. Army Air Corps and U.S. Air Force during World War II flying as a gunner on B-24 bombers.

In 1962, Hanna was selected by his childhood friend to run on a slate of candidates for Maryland State Delegate with Thomas E. Loyd.

Hanna was also a Real estate broker and appraiser. Appraiser and negotiator, Patapsco Valley Park project. President, Howard County Real Estate Board, 1961-63. District vice-president, Maryland Association of Real Estate Boards.  Member, Rotary; Veterans of Foreign Wars.

Hanna's son Gary, a helicopter pilot, was killed in Vietnam. In 1986 Hanna retired from his family company Breckinridge and Hanna real estate.

Political
Secretary, Howard County Board of Trade, 1957-1959. Hanna was elected to the House of Delegates representing Howard County from 1963-1966. William Hanna, Edwin Wafield and Senator James A. Clark, Jr. would be the approvers of state money to provide road water and sewer for Columbia, MD.  In 1969 he was elected to the new County Council form of government in Howard County. In December 1971, Hanna replaces Edward L. Cochran as chairman of the Howard County Council by a 3-2 vote.

1923 births
Democratic Party members of the Maryland House of Delegates
1994 deaths
20th-century American politicians